Blue Trombone is an LP by J. J. Johnson. An early example of hard bop, the album features pianist Tommy Flanagan, bassist Paul Chambers and drummer Max Roach. The album was released on Columbia Records in 1957 and was reissued on CD by Tristar in 1994.

Reception
Michael Nastos of AllMusic rated the album four stars and stated: "All of the music is excellent, and shows why Johnson was regarded as the very best jazz trombonist in the bop and post-bop movements."

Track listing
 Hello, Young Lovers (Richard Rodgers, Oscar Hammerstein II)
 Kev (J.J. Johnson)
 What's New (Bob Haggart, Johnny Burke)
 Blue Trombone (Part 1) (J.J. Johnson)
 Blue Trombone (Part 2) (J.J. Johnson)
 Gone with the Wind (Allie Wrubel, Herbert Magidson)
 100 Proof (J.J. Johnson)

Track listing - reissue with bonus tracks
 Hello Young Lovers
 Kev
 What's New
 Blue Trombone
 Gone With The Wind
 100 Proof
 Our Love Is Here To Stay
 Portrait Of Jenny
 Pennies From Heaven
 Viscosity
 You're Mine, You
 Daylie Double 
 Groovin'

Lineup
J.J. Johnson - trombone
Tommy Flanagan - piano  (tracks 1 - 7)
Paul Chambers - bass  (tracks 1 - 6, 8 - 13)
Max Roach - drums  (tracks 1 - 6)
Wilbur Little - bass (track 7)
Elvin Jones - drums (track 7)
Horace Silver - piano (tracks 8 - 13)
Kenny Clarke - drums (tracks 8 - 13)
Hank Mobley - tenor sax (tracks 9 - 13)

References

Columbia CL 1303

1957 albums
J. J. Johnson albums
Columbia Records albums
Hard bop albums